Gymnastics events have been staged at the Olympic Games since 1896. Soviet female gymnasts participated in every Olympic Games from 1952 to 1988, except for 1984. A total of 41 female gymnasts represented the Soviet Union. Soviet women won 88 medals at the Olympics – 9 in team all-around, 2 in team portable apparatus, 18 in individual all-around, 15 in balance beam, 17 in floor exercise, 15 in vault, and 12 in uneven bars. The medals included 33 golds. The Soviet Union won the gold medal in team all-around in all nine Summer Olympics that they participated in. The Soviet Union's success might be explained by a heavy state's investment in elite sports to fulfill its political agenda on an international stage.

Eight Soviet female gymnasts won at least six medals at the Olympic Games: Larisa Latynina (18), Polina Astakhova (10), Ludmilla Tourischeva (9), Sofia Muratova (8), Maria Gorokhovskaya (7), Nellie Kim (6), Olga Korbut (6), and Tamara Manina (6).

Competing at her only Olympics in 1952, Maria Gorokhovskaya won seven medals, setting a record for the most medals ever won in a single Olympics by a woman. She won golds in team all-around and individual all-around.

Larisa Latynina competed at three Olympic Games from 1956 to 1964, and her 18 career Olympic medals is a record for any female athlete. She won six medals in each Olympics that she participated in. Nine of her medals were gold, and she won three straight floor exercise titles. Polina Astakhova also competed at the 1956, 1960, and 1964 Games. She won 10 total medals and ranks second to Latynina for the most medals among Soviet female gymnasts. Astakhova won uneven bars gold medals in 1960 and 1964.

Latynina's and Astakhova's teammates included Sofia Muratova and Tamara Manina. Muratova won eight total medals in 1956 and 1960, and Manina won six total medals in the 1956 and 1964 Games.

Ludmilla Tourischeva competed at three Olympics and won nine total medals – one in 1968, four in 1972, and four in 1976. Her golds included the 1972 individual all-around. Olga Korbut, who competed at her first Olympics in 1972, was popular with fans and the media for her daring moves. That year, she won four medals, including golds in balance beam and floor exercise. She won two more medals in 1976 and finished her career with six overall. Nellie Kim, who competed at the 1976 and 1980 Olympics, also had six total medals. She won two golds in floor exercise.

Gymnasts

Medalists

References

Soviet Union
gymnasts
Olympic